Cristeen Fernando (born 7 August 1982) is a Sri Lankan football defender, who plays for Jupiter SC in the Sri Lankan First Division.

External links

Sri Lankan footballers
Sri Lanka international footballers
Sri Lankan Christians
1982 births
Living people
Place of birth missing (living people)

Association football defenders
Sri Lanka Football Premier League players